Pitt Island is the second largest island in the Chatham Archipelago, New Zealand. It is called Rangiauria in Māori and Rangiaotea in Moriori.<ref name="polp">Government of New Zealand, Dept. of Conservation (1999) Chatham IslandsConservation Management Strategy, map 6. Retrieved 13 July 2012.</ref>

, Pitt Island had a population of about 38 people.

Pitt Island's Kahuitara Point is the first populated location on earth to observe a sunrise in each new year, based on local time zone.

History

Pitt Island was originally inhabited by the Moriori, the indigenous peoples of the Chatham Islands, who called it Rangiaotea or Rangihaute. Their archaeological remains are found almost everywhere on the island; large quantities of artefacts are constantly coming to light. No remains of momori rakau are visible on the island, but there are records of them once being present.

The first Europeans to see and name Chatham Island were the crew of William Robert Broughton's ship  in November 1791. However, they did not see Pitt Island. He named it 'Pitt's Island' after William Pitt, 1st Earl of Chatham. In 1840, the name was simplified to "Pitt" Island. Taranaki Maori who invaded the Chatham Islands in 1835 called it Rangiauria, a name which is still in use today.

Over the years there have been many ships wrecked around both Pitt and Chatham Islands. One of these was the Australian sealing brig Glory, which was wrecked on Pitt Island in what became known as Glory Bay in January 1827.

European settlers arrived in the Flower Pot Bay in 1843.

Economy and facilities
The main sources of income for Pitt Islanders are farming, commercial fishing, and tourism. The New Zealand Department of Conservation is active on Pitt Island and, in conjunction with several landowners, administers a number of covenanted areas and reserves. The island imports fuel and most manufactured goods, and exports live sheep and cattle to mainland New Zealand.

The island has a school, a wharf, a church and a grass landing strip for light planes. A gravel road runs from Flower Pot Bay to the airstrip.  A supply ship visits Pitt Island about every three months.  Each household generates its own electricity, by either diesel generator or wind turbine. Most homes have satellite TV and broadband internet connections. Transport on the island is mostly by means of quad bikes, four wheel drives and occasionally horses. In 2011, the Pitt Island School had eight children, aged between 6 and 12 years. 

Air Chathams operates from Pitt Island to Chatham Island with their Cessna 206.

Fauna and flora
On Pitt Island there are several flocks of feral Saxon Merino sheep.

See also 
 List of islands of New Zealand

References

External links
Moriori Education Resources Online
Official Moriori Website With Information on Pitt Island Moriori

Islands of the Chatham Islands
Islands of the Pacific Ocean